Enkeleid Alikaj (born 27 December 1981 in Tiranë), known as Enkel Alikaj,  is an Albanian retired professional footballer who last played as a midfielder for Albanian club Dinamo Tirana in the Albanian First Division.

Club career

Early career
In March 2006, while still playing for Dinamo Tirana, Alikaj was given permission to go to Norway on a one-week trial at Vålerenga Fotball. Following the trial he was not given a contract after Lars Bohinen, sporting director of the club at that time, claimed that he was not "good enough" to play for the team.

Vllaznia Shkodër
On 30 July 2009, Alikaj joined Vllaznia Shkodër on a one-year contract. He was presented a day later, stating: "To be part of a team like Vllaznia it's a pleasure for every player."

Kastrioti Krujë
After one season in Shkodër, on 1 September 2010, Alikaj completed a transfer to fellow Albanian Superliga side Kastrioti Krujë by signing a one-year contract. Alikaj made his first appearance for Kastrioti in the opening league match against Shkumbini Peqin, playing for 54 minutes as the team kicked off the new season with a 2–2 at the neutral ground of Qemal Stafa Stadium. He missed the second matchday because the club gave him permission to go to Azerbaijan on trial with an unknown team.

Kukësi
On 9 August 2012, Alikaj joined newly promoted Albanian Superliga club Kukësi by signing a contract until the end of the 2012–13 season. Alikaj was part of the team which made history by becoming the first Albanian team to reach the UEFA Europa League play-off round, and also the first Albanian team to pass more than a round in the competition. He contributed with seven matches as Kukësi was eliminated by Trabzonspor.

Skënderbeu Korçë
On 31 January 2014, one day after leaving Kukësi, Alikaj joined the rivals of Skënderbeu Korçë by signing until the end of the season, turning down offers from clubs such as Partizani Tirana and Kastrioti Krujë. He played his first match with the new team two days later against his former side Vllaznia Shkodër, entering in the last 24 minutes of a 2–1 home win, helping Skënderbeu to extend the lead gap to 9 points.

After winning his second consecutive title with Skënderbeu Korçë, he left the club at the end of the 2014–15 season through a mutual agreement to terminate his contract which was due to expire a year later in 2016.

Kastrioti Krujë return
On 27 August 2015, Alikaj completed a transfer to Kastrioti Krujë by signing a one-year contract despite being the target of several top flight clubs. During the 2014–15 season, he served as team captain, and concluded the season with 27 appearances, including 25 in league, scoring 4 goals in the process, as Kastrioti failed to clinch a spot for the Albanian Superliga next season.

Elbasani
On 13 September 2016, Alikaj joined fellow Albanian First Division side Elbasani by signing a one-year contract, having begun training with the team days before. In December 2016, he along with the rest of the team boycotted the training after not getting paid for months. In an interview, he stated that the club didn't pay him, and that he was one of the five players to urge other players to boycott the training. He was suspended by the club for his actions along with the other four players. Shortly after, he officially terminated his contract with the club, becoming a free agent in the process.

Dinamo Tirana return
In January 2017, Alikaj begun training with Dinamo Tirana. On 2 February, he officially returned to the club for the first time after 11 years by signing until the end of the season. He made his return debut two days later in the match against Sopoti Librazhd by playing in the last 30 minutes of a goalless draw. Alikaj scored his first goal for Dinamo in his second appearance six days later, netting the final goal of a 3–1 win at Apolonia Fier.

International career
A former Albania youth international, Alikaj made his competitive debut with the under-21 squad on 1 April 2003 against Republic of Ireland for the qualifiers of 2004 UEFA European Under-21 Championship. He played the whole match as Albania won 1–0 at Selman Stërmasi Stadium thanks to an Erjon Rizvanolli winner. Alikaj made only one appearance during the tournament, as Albania had the best result since 1984 UEFA European Under-21 Championship, when it had won the group, as it left two teams behind (Republic of Ireland and Georgia), but was preceded by Switzerland and Russia, and thus failed to qualify to the main tournament.

Personal life
Alikaj is a practising Muslim. He has said: "I have fasting for many years and for me it is usual now, I do not feel any obstacle in my activity as a footballer.

Honours
Dinamo Tirana
Albanian Superliga: 2001–02

Skënderbeu Korçë
Albanian Superliga: 2013–14, 2014–15
Albanian Supercup: 2014

References

External links

Enkel Alikaj – Albanian Football Association profile

1981 births
Living people
Footballers from Tirana
Albanian footballers
Association football midfielders
Albania under-21 international footballers
FK Dinamo Tirana players
KF Apolonia Fier players
FK Partizani Tirana players
Besa Kavajë players
KF Teuta Durrës players
KF Vllaznia Shkodër players
KS Kastrioti players
FK Kukësi players
KF Skënderbeu Korçë players
KF Elbasani players
Kategoria Superiore players